Pierre Leroux (born 1958 in Montreal, Quebec) is a Canadian novelist, journalist and screenwriter.

Bibliography 
 1996 : Le Rire des femmes, 
 2004 : Cher éditeur (éditions Albin Michel)
 2010 : Portrait de l'artiste en caméléon in « A Disposition for a Tale of an Investigation about an Ordinary Man »  (Dutch Art Institute)

Selective filmography 

 2000 : One 4 all by Claude Lelouch
 2002 : And Now… Ladies and Gentlemen by Claude Lelouch
 2021 : Love is Better Than Life by Claude Lelouch

References

1958 births
Canadian screenwriters in French
Writers from Montreal
Canadian male novelists
Canadian male screenwriters
Journalists from Montreal
Living people
Canadian novelists in French
20th-century Canadian novelists
21st-century Canadian novelists
20th-century Canadian screenwriters
21st-century Canadian screenwriters
20th-century Canadian male writers
21st-century Canadian male writers
Canadian male non-fiction writers
20th-century Canadian journalists